is a station in Gōtsu, Shimane Prefecture, Japan

Lines
West Japan Railway Company (JR West)
Sanin Main Line

Adjacent stations
West Japan Railway Company (JR West)

Railway stations in Japan opened in 1918
Railway stations in Shimane Prefecture
Sanin Main Line